Alamdan may refer to:
 Alamdan-e Olya, Fars Province
 Alamdan-e Sofla, Fars Province
 Alamdan, Mazandaran